Unnikuttanu Joli Kitti is a 1989 Malayalam film written and directed by V. R. Gopinath. It tells the story of an unemployed youth becoming unemployable due to callous social attitudes.  It won the National Film Award for Best Film on Other Social Issues.

Cast
 Murali	
Jose Thomas
 KP Kumaran	
 PA Bakker
 Krishnankutty Nair	
 Baby Drisya G Nath	
 Jameela Malik
 Narendra Prasad
 Thara

References

External links

1990 films
1990s Malayalam-language films
Best Film on Other Social Issues National Film Award winners